Harriet Miller (July 4, 1919 – January 6, 2010) was an American chemist in Pennsylvania and politician in California. Miller was a mayor of Santa Barbara, California.

Early life 
On July 4, 1919, Miller was born in Council, Idaho. Miller's father was a teacher and high school principal and her mother was a school teacher.

Education 
Miller earned a Bachelor's degree in Chemistry from Whitman College in Walla Walla, Washington. Miller earned a master's degree in Chemistry from the University of Pennsylvania.

Career 
In 1944, Miller became a chemist at Atlantic Richfield (now ARCO) in Philadelphia, Pennsylvania until 1950.

Miller was elected Superintendent of the Montana Office of Public Instruction.

In 1987, Miller was appointed as a member of the city council in Santa Barbara, California.

In 1995, Miller became the mayor of Santa Barbara, until 2001.

Personal life 
In 1981, Miller moved to Santa Barbara, California. On January 6, 2010, Miller died at her home in Santa Barbara, California.  She was 90 years old.

See also 
 List of mayors of Santa Barbara, California

References 

1919 births
2010 deaths
Mayors of Santa Barbara, California
California city council members
Superintendents of Public Instruction of Montana
Women in Montana politics
People from Council, Idaho
Women city councillors in California
Women mayors of places in California
21st-century American women